Eskikavak is a village in the Kiğı District, Bingöl Province, Turkey. The village is populated by Kurds of the Çarekan tribe and had a population of 102 in 2021.

The hamlets of Eski Kavak and Seyitdüzü are attached to the village.

References 

Villages in Kiğı District
Kurdish settlements in Bingöl Province